Žan Karničnik (born 18 September 1994) is a Slovenian football defender who plays for Slovenian PrvaLiga club Celje, on loan from Ludogorets Razgrad.

Club career
Karničnik played for the youth teams of Slovenian club Dravograd before moving to the Styrian League side Radlje ob Dravi in 2013 to start his senior career. In August 2015, he signed with Maribor B, the reserve team of PrvaLiga side Maribor. After being a regular starter for Maribor B for two seasons, he made his first and only appearance for Maribor's first team in May 2017, starting in a 3–1 loss against Aluminij.

On 26 July 2017, Karničnik joined Slovenian Second League club Mura. At the end of his first season at Mura, the club won the league and was thus promoted to the PrvaLiga. In the 2020–21 season, Karničnik made 34 appearances as he won the PrvaLiga title with Mura, the first domestic league title in the club's history.

In January 2022, Karničnik moved to Bulgarian champions Ludogorets Razgrad. With Ludogorets, he won the national title in the 2021–22 season, making eleven league appearances in the second part of the season. He was set to leave Ludogorets in the summer of 2022 due to a lack of playing time and was on the verge of signing for Norwegian side Lillestrøm SK, but the transfer was cancelled as the paperwork was sent too late after the transfer window had already closed. After only five games played in the first part of the 2022–23 season, he returned to Slovenia and joined Celje on a one-year loan, with the option of making the transfer permanent.

International career
Karničnik made his debut for the Slovenia national team on 8 October 2021 in a World Cup qualifier against Malta.

Honours
Maribor
Slovenian First League: 2016–17

Mura
Slovenian First League: 2020–21
Slovenian Second League: 2017–18
Slovenian Cup: 2019–20

Ludogorets Razgrad
Bulgarian First League: 2021–22
Bulgarian Supercup: 2022

References

External links
Žan Karničnik at NZS 
 

1994 births
Living people
Sportspeople from Slovenj Gradec
Slovenian footballers
Slovenian expatriate footballers
Association football defenders
NK Maribor players
NŠ Mura players
PFC Ludogorets Razgrad players
PFC Ludogorets Razgrad II players
NK Celje players
Slovenian PrvaLiga players
Slovenian Second League players
First Professional Football League (Bulgaria) players
Second Professional Football League (Bulgaria) players
Slovenia international footballers
Slovenian expatriate sportspeople in Bulgaria
Expatriate footballers in Bulgaria